Ferdinando Imposimato (9 April 1936 – 2 January 2018) was an Italian magistrate and the honorary president of the Supreme Court of Italy.

Biography
Imposimato was born at Maddaloni, in the province of Caserta, in 1936. He graduated in law at the  University of Naples in 1959. After becoming police vice-commissar, he worked in Brescia and then in Forlì. After one year in Rome as a functionary of the Ministry of Treasury, he became a magistrate in 1964.

During his career as a prosecutor, Imposimato was in charge of the investigation for the kidnapping of Aldo Moro, Mehmet Ali Ağca's attempted assassination of Pope John Paul II, the assassination of banker Michele Sindona, and several Mafia trials. In 1981 he was in charge of the trial against the Banda della Magliana. Two years later, his brother Franco was killed in revenge and, after endless menaces against his family from organized crime, he left his work as judge in 1986, working as United Nations consultant against the drugs market. He also dealt with violations of human rights in South America.

In 1987, Imposimato was elected to the Italian Senate on the list of the Independent Left, associated with the Italian Communist Party. In 1992 he was re-elected to the Chamber of Deputies. He was a member of the Parliamentary Anti-Mafia Commission in three consecutive legislatures.

He believed that some top members of the CIA were aware of the presence of 9/11 terrorists in the United States but did not alert "the only agency competent to counter terrorism on US soil," the FBI. He suggested that the only possibility for achieving justice is to submit the case to the Prosecutor of the International Criminal Court.

In January 2015, he was nominated by the Five Star Movement as its candidate for the 2015 presidential election after an online survey by supporters of the movement, winning 32% of the votes.

Imposimato died on 2 January 2018 in Rome, at the age of 81.

Notes

External links
CBS Pins Shooting of Pope on KGB in Accuracy in Media
The smearing of Romano Prodi in The Economist

1936 births
2018 deaths
University of Naples Federico II alumni
Members of the Senate of the Republic (Italy)
Members of the Chamber of Deputies (Italy)
Candidates for President of Italy
Italian human rights activists
20th-century Italian judges
Italian prosecutors
People from the Province of Caserta